Kyrylo Oleksiyovych Budanov (born 4 January 1986) is a Ukrainian military leader who is the chief of the Main Directorate of Intelligence of the Ministry of Defense of Ukraine since August 2020. He holds the rank of major general.

Biography 
Budanov was born in Kyiv on January 4, 1986. He graduated from the Odessa Institute of the Ground Forces (2007), after which he served in the special forces of the Main Intelligence Directorate of the Ministry of Defense of Ukraine.

In 2014, he took part in the Russo-Ukrainian War and was wounded several times. In 2018-2020, he participated in special military operations, information about which is classified.

On 4 April 2019, Budanov's Chevrolet Evanda car was blown up by a Russian with documents in the name of Alexei Lomaka, who planted a mine, but it detonated prematurely. The attacker and the sabotage group that was supposed to blow up the Ukrainian spy chief were detained.

In 2020, he became Deputy Director of one of the Departments of the Foreign Intelligence Service of Ukraine. 

On August 5, 2020, President of Ukraine Volodymyr Zelensky appointed Budanov as head of the Main Intelligence Directorate of the Ministry of Defense.

On March 11, 2022 he became the chairman of the Coordinating Headquarters for the Treatment of Prisoners of War.

In September 2022, Budanov participated in the largest prisoner exchange operation between Ukraine and the Russian Federation, when 215 Ukrainian defenders returned home, including more than 100 fighters and commanders of the Azov Regiment.

In February 2023, the head of the Servant of the People parliamentary bloc, Davyd Arakhamia, stated that Oleksii Reznikov would be replaced by Budanov as defence minister. However, the replacement did not happen, and Budanov was not appointed.

Military ranks 
 Brigadier general (24 August 2021)
 Major general (3 April 2022)

Awards 
 Full Knight of the Order for Courage

References

External link

 1986 births
Living people
Military personnel from Kyiv
Recipients of the Order of Gold Star (Ukraine)
Major generals of Ukraine
Ukrainian military personnel of the 2022 Russian invasion of Ukraine
Odesa Military Academy alumni
Chevaliers of the Order For Courage